USS Belle Isle (AG-73/AKS-21) was a Basilan-class miscellaneous auxiliary acquired by the U.S. Navy during World War II. Belle Isle was configured as a repair ship and used in Pacific Ocean operations. At war’s end she was converted to a stores ship before being finally decommissioned.

Constructed in Maine 
Belle Isle (AG 73) was laid down on 19 September 1944 at South Portland, Maine, by the New England Shipbuilding Corporation under a U.S. Maritime Commission contract (MCE hull 3070); launched on 3 November 1944; sponsored by Miss Sally Goding; transferred to the Navy on a loan basis on 15 November 1944; commissioned that same day for the voyage to the conversion yard; decommissioned on 18 November 1944 at Hoboken, New Jersey, for conversion to an electronics repair ship by the Bethlehem Steel Corporation; and recommissioned on 13 July 1945.

World War II-related service 
Belle Isle was assigned to Service Division (ServDiv) 104, Service Squadron (ServRon) 10, U.S. Pacific Fleet, and, by 7 October, was at Okinawa in the Ryukyu Islands making repairs for ships of the Pacific Fleet.

She served at Okinawa until heading for Japan early in December. The ship arrived at Wakayama on 15 December and began repair duties for the occupation forces. That assignment lasted until she departed Japan on 31 March 1946 and headed back to the United States.

Post-war decommissioning
After making port at San Francisco, California, the electronics repair ship shifted south to San Diego, California, to prepare for inactivation. She was decommissioned on 30 August 1946 and berthed with the San Diego Group, Pacific Reserve Fleet.

Temporary reactivation
On 18 August 1951, while still in reserve, Belle Isle was reclassified a stores issue ship and redesignated AKS-211.

Final decommissioning
She remained in reserve until 1960. On 1 April 1960, her name was struck from the Naval Vessel Register. Her disposal was approved on 3 August 1960, and she was apparently sunk as a target later that year.

In November 1960, the ships in Destroyer Squadron 13 sank the Belle Isle off the coast of San Diego.

References
 
 NavSource Online: Service Ship Photo Archive - AG-73 / AKS-21 Belle Isle

 

Basilan-class auxiliary ships
Ships built in Portland, Maine
1944 ships
World War II auxiliary ships of the United States
Liberty ships